was a daimyō and a teacher of kenjutsu and military strategy in Japan during the Edo period. His highest-ranking pupil was Tokugawa Ietsuna, fourth Tokugawa shōgun. Munefuyu, who also went by the name Matajūrō, was the third son of Yagyū Munenori. One of his elder brothers was Yagyū Jūbei Mitsuyoshi. His younger brother was Retsudō Gisen, the real person who is fictionalized as Yagyū Retsudō, leader of the Ura-Yagyū (Shadow Yagyū), in Lone Wolf and Cub.

In 1650, Munefuyu became the head of the Yagyū clan. In 1657 he received the title Hida no kami. In 1668 he rose to the rank of daimyo of the Yagyū Domain when he received an additional grant of land, bringing his holdings above the 10,000 koku minimum.

Initially weaker than his brothers and father, a kōan tells how he managed to become an expert after training his zanshin (vigilance) for several years in a temple. Despite his success and fame, he was defeated in a single stroke by Yagyū Renya Toshikane (fourth headmaster of the Yagyū Shinkage-ryū), who had previously fought, before Tokugawa Yoshinao lord of Owari, over 30 duels without being hit. It is said since that time, Owari Yagyū and Edo Yagyū broke ties.

Sources
This article incorporates material in 柳生宗冬 (Yagyū Munefuyu) in the Japanese Wikipedia, retrieved on December 25, 2007.

Further reading
 

1613 births
1675 deaths
Daimyo
Yagyū clan
Hatamoto
Japanese swordfighters
People of Edo-period Japan